Justice Selden may refer to:

Henry R. Selden, judge of the New York Court of Appeals
Samuel L. Selden, chief judge of the New York Court of Appeals